Tanzi may refer to:

 Tanzi (surname), Italian surname
Tanzi di Blevio, Italian aristocratic family
Tanzi effect
Tanzi, Taichung, district in Taiwan
Trafford Tanzi, play by Clare Luckham